Lund is a city in the southern Swedish province of Scania, across the Öresund strait from Copenhagen. The town had 91,940 inhabitants out of a municipal total of 121,510 . It is the seat of Lund Municipality, Scania County. The Öresund Region, which includes Lund, is home to more than 4.1 million people.

Archeologists date the foundation of Lund to around 990, when Scania was part of Denmark. From 1103 it was the seat of the Catholic Metropolitan Archdiocese of Lund, and the towering Lund Cathedral, built circa 1090–1145, still stands at the centre of the town. Denmark ceded the city to Sweden in the Treaty of Roskilde in 1658, and its status as part of Sweden was formalised in 1720.

Lund University, established in 1666, is one of Scandinavia's oldest and largest institutions for education and research.  The university and its buildings dominate much of the centre of the city, and have led to Lund becoming a regional centre for high tech industry.

History 

Lund is sometimes mentioned as the oldest town or city in present-day Sweden, although it has only been formally established as such for 300 years of its at least thousand-year history. It is old enough that its origins are unclear, but is presumed to have existed by the end of the Viking Age. Until the 1980s, the town was thought to have been founded around 1020 by either Sweyn I Forkbeard or his son Canute the Great of Denmark. The area was then part of the kingdom of Denmark. But, recent archaeological discoveries suggest that the first settlement dated to circa 990, possibly the relocation of settlers at Uppåkra. The Uppåkra settlement dates back to the first century B.C. and its remains are at the present site of the village of Uppåkra. The new location of Lund, on a hill and across a ford, gave the new site considerable defensive advantages in comparison with Uppåkra, situated on the highest point of a large plain.

The organisation of the Danish church begun under the rule of Canute the Great.  Lund became the see of one of seven dioceses in 1048. In 1104 it became an archbishopric. Lund's ecclesiastical province comprised Scandinavia and even Garðar on Greenland. The diocese of nearby Dalby was absorbed in 1066. Lund Cathedral was similarly founded in or shortly after 1103. In 1152, the Norwegian archdiocese of Nidaros was founded as a separate province of the church, independent of Lund. In 1164 Sweden also acquired an archbishop of its own, although he was nominally subordinate to the archbishop of Lund. It is still, as the diocese of Lund, a diocese in the Church of Sweden.

Lund Cathedral School (Katedralskolan) was founded in 1085 by the Danish king Canute the Saint. This is the oldest school in Scandinavia and one of the oldest in Northern Europe. Many prominent people were educated there, among them the actor Max von Sydow and several high-ranking politicians.

Lund was ceded to Sweden in 1658 as part of the terms of the Treaty of Roskilde.  It was recaptured by Denmark in 1676 during the early phases of the Scanian War.  The exceptionally bloody Battle of Lund was fought just north of the city in 1676, and ended in a decisive Swedish victory; Swedish control of Scania was confirmed in the Peace of Lund later that year. Sweden's control over Scania, and hence Lund, was formalised by treaty in 1720.

Scandinavia's first University, the Academy of Lund was founded in the 1400s. It was suppressed during the Danish Reformation in 1537.  The present Lund University was established in 1666.

In 1943, during the Second World War, Lund was accidentally bombed by a British aircraft. No deaths were reported, though some people were injured by glass fragments.

Over the second half of the 20th century the population of Lund more than doubled, driven in large part by the growth of the university and high tech industries.  For example, Tetra Pak, the food packaging and processing company, was founded in Lund in 1952. Suburbs were added to the outer edges of the city: Klostergården, Norra Fäladen and Linero in the 1960s, Norra Nöbbelöv in the 1970s, Gunnesbo in the 1980s and Värpinge in the 1990s.

Geography 

From the top of the Sankt Hans Hill it is possible to see Copenhagen, the capital of Denmark.

The central part of Lund largely retains its medieval street layout.  A few buildings from the Middle Ages remain, including Lund Cathedral, Liberiet, St. Peter's Priory, the restaurant Stäket and Krognoshuset.  Many of today's buildings in the centre were constructed in the late 1800s, including Katedralskolan, the Grand Hotel and the main building and library of Lund University.

City squares 
Lund city contains four main city squares that are connected by a number of roads and passages that represent the main city centre containing numerous restaurants, shops and bars. Clemenstorget is a tree-covered city square located alongside the railway and associated station, hosts a small market and is the central terminus of the city's tramway. Bantorget is a green park-square close to the central station and Lund's Grand Hotel is placed there. The city hall is located on the main city square - Stortorget which often features concerts and various cultural and political events. Mårtenstorget hosts the Lund Market Hall, has many restaurants, food trucks and bars around it and serves as a market square during the daytime. In earlier times the square was used as a cattle market and was known as "Oxtorget". Smaller city squares in Lund include Domkyrkoplatsen, Petriplatsen, Västra stationstorget, Sockertorget and Knut den Stores Torg.

Parks and nature

Lund's most central park is Lundagård, which, along with the adjoining University square, forms the centre of the University. The park is dominated by historic buildings including Lund Cathedral, Lund University Main Building, and Kungshuset. The trees of the park are home to a large colony of rooks.

The much larger main city park (Stadsparken) is located in the south-west corner of the city center. The site was used for the Lund Exhibition in 1907 and subsequently developed into a public park between 1909 and 1911. The park contains planted gardens, a small lake, a children's playground and bandstands, as well as the public swimming center Högevallsbadet and the former buildings of Lund Observatory. It also has a menagerie that houses different varieties of birds.

Other significant areas of greenery in the city include the Botanical Garden (Botaniska trädgården) and Sankt Hans Hill in the north of the city. The nature preserve Rinnebäck Gorge (Rinnebäcksravinen), The Källby dams (Källby dammar) and the community park Folkparken are located in the western part of the city. The nature preserve Nöbbelövs Marshland (Nöbbelövs mosse) is located in the northwest of the city.

Popular places for swimming close to the city are the beaches in neighboring Lomma, Bjärred and Malmö and lakes such as the nature preserve Billebjer and the Dalby quarry (Dalby stenbrott) in the eastern countryside of the city.

Climate 
Lund, like the rest of far southern Sweden, has an oceanic climate. The climate is relatively mild compared to other locations at similar latitudes, or even somewhat further south, mainly because of its proximity to the sea. Because of Lund's northerly latitude, daylight lasts as long as 17 hours at midsummer, and only around 7 hours in mid-winter.

Lund has arguably the mildest climate of the country in average highs. In terms of yearly means and average lows Falsterbo is marginally milder.

Rainfall is light to moderate throughout the year with an average of 169 wet days. Snowfall occurs sparingly, mainly from December to March, but snow cover does not typically remain for a long time, and some winters are virtually free of snow.

Demographics 

The population of the city has increased steadily over the last century. Of the inhabitants of the municipality, 18.8% were reported to have been born outside of Sweden in 2014. Lund University students make up a significant part of the city's population.

Governance 

Lund is governed by Lund Municipality.  The municipality is responsible for the city of Lund, nearby settlements including Dalby, Södra Sandby and Veberöd, and the surrounding countryside.  It reached its current form in 1974 following the absorption of a number of nearby municipalities.  In 2014 the city itself was officially divided into 14 administrative divisions.

The municipality is governed by a municipal assembly of 65 members, who elect a municipal executive committee of 13 members.   the mayor and chairman of the executive committee has been Philip Sandberg of the Liberals.

Education

Lund University 

The university dominates much of the centre of Lund.  It was founded in 1666 following the transfer of Scania to Sweden under the Treaty of Roskilde and is the second-oldest university in Sweden after Uppsala University.  Its traditional centre is in Lundagård park but stretches out towards the north east of the city where the large engineering faculty is located.  Today, Lund University is one of northern Europe's largest, with eight faculties, 41,000 students and over 2,000 separate courses.  It is and has consistently ranked in the world top 100 universities and is a member of the League of European Research Universities as well as the global Universitas 21 network.

Other educational institutions 
Katedralskolan, the cathedral school, founded in 1085, is the oldest school in Scandinavia. Today it is a high gymnasium with about 1,400 students studying in five different programmes.

Östervångskolan is a specialskola (special school) for D/deaf and hard of hearing students, providing education in Swedish and Swedish Sign Language. It accepts students from  Skåne and surrounding areas. The school was founded in 1871 as Skånes Anstalt för Döfstumma i Lund (Skåne Institute for the Dead and Dumb) and had its premises on Östervångsvägen until 2016 when it relocated to Tunaskolan. The International School of Lund Katedralskolan (ISLK) later moved to the Östervångsvägen site.

The Royal Swedish Physiographic Society is a learned society based in Lund.

Culture 

The culture in Lund is characterised by the university education and research, and the large student population and student traditions, such as a student theatre group since 1886. A substantial part of the student night-life is located at student fraternities called 'Nations'.

Lund Cathedral, the former Catholic and the now Lutheran cathedral in Lund, is the seat of the bishop of Lund of the Church of Sweden.
Lund also has a city theatre (though without a professional local ensemble of its own) and a number of other places for concerts and theatres.

Literature, theatre and cinema 
Numerous prominent figures from the literary world lived and worked in Lund, often in association with the university and theatre. Prominent examples include Esias Tegnér, writer, poet and bishop, and August Strindberg, playwright, novelist and poet.  A longer list is given below with other notable natives.  The Lund novel is a genre in its own right, a bildungsroman in which a young student experiences life in Lund, Copenhagen and sometimes Österlen whilst maturing as an individual.
The Lund novel is exemplified by the work of Fritiof Nilsson Piraten and Frank Heller.

The spex are a form of student theatre particular to Nordic universities, with a strong tradition in Lund.  They are parodistic musical plays, often setting well-known music to new lyrics and mixing up the historical and the present in unconventional intrigues.  Comedians Hans Alfredson and Anders Jansson started their careers in the Lund spex.

The concluding scenes in Ingmar Bergman's classic film Wild Strawberries are set in Lund.

The Lund International Architecture Film Festival is held annually in the autumn.

Museums 

Lund hosts the largest open-air museum of Scania, Kulturen. Kulturen is the second oldest dedicated open-air museum in the world.  Founded in 1892 by Georg Karlin, it consists of more than 30 buildings, as well as collections exhibiting Scanian art, crafts, local archaeology and history.

Several museums are attached to the university.  The Lund University Historical Museum is based in the Lundagård park.  Its exhibitions were updated in 2018 and cover the history, archeology and zoology of Scania.  There is a separate Lund Cathedral museum.
The Museum of Sketches for Public Art is a unique museum that documents the development of public artworks.  The Vattenhallen Science Center, connected to the university's engineering faculty, has an interactive presentation of science and research.

Lundakarnevalen 
The Lund carnival has been held every four years since the mid-nineteenth century: traditional accounts say it originated at a wedding in 1849 (the four-year intervals place the party in 2002, 2006, 2010, etc.). Arranged by the students of the university, from the 1950s onwards the event has grown in size and intensity (with some 5,500 volunteers 2010), but it remains an amateur event. Midway between a music and stage fair, a city festival, and an outpouring of satire, parody and general madness. Some students dress up in costumes, often relating to and poking fun at current issues, and parade in wagons. Others perform humorous skits in the evenings. The carnival revues and other stage entertainments have launched a number of well-known entertainers and actors over the years.

Music

Lund has long been a regional centre for classical and church music. In particular, Lund is renowned for its vibrant amateur choir scene, with choirs such as Carolinae damkör, Domkyrkokören, Katedralkören, Lunds akademiska kör, Lund Chamber Choir (Swedish: Lunds Kammarkör), Lunds Studentsångförening, Lunds vokalensemble, and the Svanholm Singers. Since 2006, Lund has been the host of the biannual Lund International Choral Festival.  Classical orchestras based in the city include the Lund City Orchestra, the Academic Orchestra and Lund New Chamber Orchestra.

In more recent decades, Lund has also developed a lively pop and jazz scene.  The cultural venue Mejeriet opened in 1987 in a former dairy building just outside the city park.  It has hosted concerts by both well-known and emerging bands.  The pop singer and television presenter Måns Zelmerlöw was born and grew up in Lund.  Artists associated with Lund include DJ and record producer Axwell, rock musician Kal P. Dal, rapper Timbuktu, indie pop group The Radio Dept., and singer and songwriter Amanda Jenssen. The music venue Olympen, hosted many famous artists from 1971 to 2009.

Sports 

Lund's handball team, LUGI HF plays in both the men's and women's top leagues. Lund hosted matches from the 2011 Handball World Championship in the Sparbanken Skåne Arena. Lund has a chess team, Lunds ASK, that for decades has been among the top teams in Sweden. Lund has two Division 1 football clubs, Torns IF and Lunds BK.  It is also the birthplace of the online football manager game Hattrick. Lugi Rugbyklubb, based in Lund, is one of Sweden's few rugby clubs.

Transport

Railways 

Lund is a railway junction and is well served by rail traffic.  The main railway station, Lund Central,  is Sweden's third busiest railway station, with around 37 000 passengers per day .  Another, smaller station serves the suburb of Gunnesbo in the north-west of the city.  Lund has been on the Southern Main Line, which connects Malmö and Stockholm, since it opened in 1856. The West Coast Line to Gothenburg branches off the Southern Main Line just north of Lund Central station.  Thus there are direct services to all of Sweden's three largest cities, as well as to Copenhagen and Helsingør via the Öresund Bridge. Rail services to Denmark, and within Scania and neighbouring counties, are mainly provided by the Øresundståg.  These trains are operated jointly by Skånetrafiken in Scania and the Danish State Railways in Denmark.  Longer distance services, notably to Stockholm, are provided by SJ. Local traffic is served by the Pågatåg electric multiple units, which provide stopping services within Scania.

Cycling 
Lund has been praised for its cycling infrastructure. There has been no increase in car usage for the past 10 years.

Buses 
Since 2019, the bus network in Lund has been licensed to the company Vy Buss, overseen by Skånetrafiken.
They operate green-coloured buses which, for environmental reasons, are powered by compressed natural gas.  The busses run on a total of seven bus lines.  A survey carried out on behalf of Region Skåne in 2015 found that 11% of Lund residents used the bus network regularly.

Tramway 

Plans to initiate a nearly 6 km (3.7 mi) tram network to achieve faster and higher-capacity public transport between Lund Central Station and many of the largest work-places in the city were approved in 2015. The entire construction now stands finished and the tram line is slated to thrown open to the public on December 13, 2020. The 15-minute tram ride connects Lund Central Station with the hospital, Lund University (LTH), Ideon Science Park, the new upcoming district of Brunnshög, the MAX IV synchrotron light source, and, the European Spallation Source. Long-term plans to extend this network to the suburban towns of Bjärred (via Öresundsvägen), Dalby, Staffanstorp and Södra Sandby have been shelved.

Major roads 
Lund has been connected to the motorway network since 1953 when the E22 was opened between Lund and Malmö.  The E22 was the first motorway in Sweden, and was originally built around the edge of the town; however following the expansion of the suburbs out to the east in the latter half of the 20th century it now passes through the city. The E22 forms the main north-south trunk route through Lund.  The largest east-west road is the multi-lane northern ring road which also passes through the city limits.   
There are also other connections to most major roads in the area, for example the E6 via Riksväg 16, and the Länsväg 108 which connects to the E65.

Airports 
Lund is served by Copenhagen Airport, the largest airport in the Nordic countries, which can be reached by frequent direct trains in about 35 minutes. The second airport in the area, Malmö Airport, is located about 26 kilometres (16 miles) away and is mainly used for domestic flights. There also used to be a very small airstrip, Hasslanda Flygfält, to the south of Lund, mainly used for private and charter flights. The airstrip closed in 2008.

Economy 

Lund is a regional centre for high tech companies, several of which are based in the north-east of the city.  Companies with offices in Lund include Sony Mobile Communications, Ericsson, Arm Holdings, and Microsoft.  The Swedish telecommunications company Doro has its head office in Lund.  Gambro, one of the key companies in the development of the artificial kidney, was founded in Lund in 1964 and retains a significant presence in the city.  Alfa Laval, the international manufacturer of heat exchangers and separators, have a factory in Lund, and Tetra Pak have their headquarters and part of production in town. Network video camera maker Axis Communications was founded in Lund in 1984 and maintains its headquarters in the city as an independently operated subsidiary of Canon.    
Other important industries include pharmaceuticals, biotechnology, and publishing and library services.

Skåne University Hospital and Lund University are major employers, with extensive research facilities.  In particular, the Lund Institute of Technology has connections with the high tech industry in the city.  A science park, Ideon Science Park, was founded in 1983 as a collaboration between Lund University, Lund Municipality and Wihlborgs Fastigheter AB.   it hosts about 350 companies, employing 2,700 people.  Many of these are high tech companies that have ties to the university.

The 2010s have seen the development of two major research facilities in Lund, both in collaboration with the university.  MAX IV is the world's most powerful synchrotron light source and a Swedish national facility.  It was inaugurated on 21 June 2016.  The European Spallation Source (ESS) is a pulsed neutron source under construction on a site just north of MAX IV.  ESS is expected to directly employ about 450 people when it is completed in around 2023.

Tetra Pak was founded in Lund in 1951 by Ruben Rausing.  Their principal product is packages and equipment for aseptic packaging of food, principally using plastic-coated cardboard.  As of January 2015 Tetra Pak employed around 3,500 staff at their headquarters in Lund.
 
The pharmaceutical company AstraZeneca used to have a large presence in Lund but their offices closed in 2010.  The site was re-developed as a research park named Medicon Village.   over 1,200 people worked in more than 100 organisations based at Medicon Village.

Notable residents

Literary residents

See also 
Lund Principle, an important principle in ecumenical relations between Christian churches.
Uppsala
All Saints Abbey, Lund
Östra Torn

References

External links 

Lunds Kommun - Official site
Visitlund.se Tourist information

 
Municipal seats of Skåne County
Swedish municipal seats
Populated places in Skåne County
Viking Age populated places
Populated places established in the 10th century
10th-century establishments in Skåne County
Cities in Skåne County